Rock Action may refer to:

 Nickname of Scott Asheton, drummer of American rock band, The Stooges
 Rock Action (album), a 2001 album by Scottish band, Mogwai
 Rock Action Records, a British record label
 Rock Action, a South East Asian pay TV channel.